Mike Golden and Friends (MG&F) is an American independent band from Chicago, Illinois, United States, fronted by singer-songwriter Mike Golden. They started in 2009 when Mike Golden dropped out of Purdue University to pursue music on a full-time basis.

MG&F remained popular through-out the Chicago region with songs such as "Stay Here". MG&F was included in the 2014 Ubisoft video game release, Watch Dogs, with their song "No Number". The game has gone on to sell over 10 million copies worldwide. The high profile game inclusion lead to the MG&F song "Every Morning Love" being used by Walmart stores across the US, as well as requests to perform in multiple festivals including the Sundance Film Festival, Red Gorilla at SXSW, Indie Week Europe, Canadian Music Week, LoveFest, Center of The Universe, Taste of Chicago, Indie Week Toronto, GreenFest Chicago, ChillFest Chicago, Chance The Rapper's T.I.P. Fest and CMJ. MG&F have had songs on Tony Hawk's Ride Channel and in multiple broadcast television shows.

Features and collaborations
Mike Golden has been featured on Donnie Trumpet's The Social Experiment download album, Surf, on the song "GO" as well as Odd Couple Beats Chatterbox on "Talkin' Like That" and Stefan Ponce on the song "Kids" and has been covered as a cross over stand out by sources (and Hype Machine Sources) like Vibe, Complex, Elevator, DJ Booth, The 405, Green Label, Fake Shore Drive, and Dynasty.

Mike Golden has performed with and collaborated across the United States, Canada and Europe with: Vic Mensa, Chance the Rapper, Donnie Trumpet (The Social Experiment), JP Floyd(Kids These Days), Spencer Ludwig, Dally Austin (Save Money), Rocky Fresh, Jus Blaze, Marc Walloch(AWOLNation, Company of Thieves), Chip Da Ripper, Brett Michaels, Warrant among others.

Discography
Trees pt 1
Trees pt 2
Groceries
Utopia
Golden

References

Musical groups from Chicago